Valdelinares is a municipality and ski resort located in the Sierra de Gúdar range of the Sistema Ibérico, in the province of Teruel, Aragon, Spain. According to the 2004 census (INE), the municipality had a population of 141 inhabitants.

Valdelinares has a mostly dry, high mountain climate with much snow in winter. In the summer months the town is popular with hikers and mountaineers.

See also
Sierra de Gúdar

References

External links

Sierra de Gúdar - Monumentos y rutas en Gúdar - Teruel - Turismo 

Municipalities in the Province of Teruel